The Lochnagar mine south of the village of La Boisselle in the Somme  was an underground explosive charge, secretly planted by the British during the First World War, to be ready for 1 July 1916, the first day on the Somme. A large crater has survived to the present day and is known as the Lochnagar crater or in French as Trou de mine de La Boisselle.

The British named the mine after Lochnagar Street, the trench from which the gallery was driven. The charge at Lochnagar was one of 19 mines that were dug under the German lines on the British section of the Somme front, to assist the infantry advance at the start of the battle.

The attack on either flank was defeated by German small arms and artillery fire, except on the extreme right flank and just south of La Boisselle, north of the Lochnagar Crater. The crater has been preserved as a memorial and a religious service is held each 1 July.

Background

1914
French and German military operations began on the Somme in September 1914. A German advance westwards towards Albert was stopped by the French at La Boisselle and attempts to resume offensive warfare in October failed. Both sides reduced their attacks to local operations or raids and began to fortify their remaining positions with underground works. On 18 December, the French captured the La Boisselle village cemetery at the west end of a German salient and established an advanced post only  from the German front line. On Christmas Day 1914, French engineers sank the first mine shaft at La Boisselle.

1915

The French mine workings were taken over when the British moved into the Somme front. George Fowke moved the 174th and 183rd Tunnelling Companies into the area; at first the British did not have enough miners to take over the many French shafts; the problem was temporarily solved when the French agreed to leave their engineers at work for several weeks. On 24 July, 174th Tunnelling Company  established headquarters at Bray, taking over some 66 shafts at Carnoy, Fricourt, Maricourt and La Boisselle. The British formed the 178th and 179th Tunnelling Companies in August, followed by the 185th and 252nd Tunnelling Companies in October. The 181st Tunnelling Company was also present on the Somme. 

Elaborate precautions were taken to preserve secrecy, since no continuous front line trench ran through the area opposite the west end of La Boisselle and the British front line. The  site was defended by posts near the mine shafts. The right and left tunnels collapsed and it was later found that the German explosion had detonated the British charge.

Prelude

1916

At the start of the Battle of Albert (1–13 July), the name given by the British to the first two weeks of the Battle of the Somme, La Boisselle stood on the main axis of British attack. Royal Engineer tunnelling companies were to make two contributions to the Allied preparations for the battle, by placing 19 mines of varying sizes beneath the German positions along the front line and by preparing a series of shallow Russian saps from the British front line into no man's land. The saps would be opened at Zero Hour and allow the infantry to attack the German positions from a comparatively short distance.

The Germans in La Boisselle had fortified the cellars of the ruined houses and cratered ground in the vicinity make a direct infantry assault on the village impossible. Y Sap and Lochnagar mines, named after the trenches from which they were dug, were excavated on the north-east and the south-east of La Boisselle, to assist the attack on either side of the German salient in the village. The 185th Tunnelling Company started work on Lochnagar on 11 November 1915. The diggings were handed over to 179th Tunnelling Company in March 1916.

The Lochnagar mine consisted of two chambers with a shared access tunnel. The shaft was sunk in the communication trench called Lochnagar Street. After the Black Watch had arrived at La Boisselle at the end of July 1915, many fortifications, originally dug by the French, had been given Scottish names. For silence, the tunnellers used bayonets with spliced handles and worked barefoot on a floor covered with sandbags. Flints were carefully prised out of the chalk and laid on the floor; if the bayonet was manipulated two-handed, an assistant caught the dislodged material. Spoil was placed in sandbags and passed hand-by-hand along a row of miners sitting on the floor and stored along the side of the tunnel, later to be used to tamp the charge.

As the chambers were not big enough to hold all the explosive, the tunnels that branched to form the 'Y' were also filled with ammonal. The Lochnagar and the Y Sap mines were "overcharged" to ensure that large rims were formed from the disturbed ground. Communication tunnels were also dug for use immediately after the first attack, including a tunnel across no man's land to a point close to the Lochnagar mine, ready to extend to the crater after the detonation as a covered route. The mines were laid without interference by German miners but as the explosives were placed, German miners could be heard below Lochnagar and above the Y Sap mine.

An officer wrote

Battle

1 July

The explosion of the Lochnagar mine was initiated by Captain James Young of the 179th Tunnelling Company, who pressed the switches and observed that the firing had been successful. The Lochnagar mine, along with Y Sap mine, was the largest mine ever detonated. The sound of the blast was considered the loudest man-made noise in history up to that point, with reports suggesting it was heard in London. They would be surpassed a year later by the mines in the Battle of Messines. The Lochnagar mine lay on the sector assaulted by the Grimsby Chums, a Pals battalion (10th Battalion, The Lincolnshire Regiment). The infantry of the 34th Division, which was composed of Pals battalions from the English provinces, attacked the positions on either side of La Boisselle, of Reserve Infantry Regiment 110 (RIR 110) of the 28th Reserve Division, mainly recruited from Baden.

During the day, German artillery fired into Sausage Valley and in the afternoon began systematically to shell areas and then fire bursts of machine-gun fire to catch anyone who moved. German artillery also began to bombard the crater, where wounded and stragglers sought shelter, particularly those from Sausage Valley to the south of the village. British artillery began to fire on the crater, which led to shell bursts on both slopes, leaving the men inside with nowhere to hide. A British aircraft flew low overhead and a soldier waved a dead man's shirt, at which the aeroplane flew away and the British shelling stopped.

Aerial observation
The blowing of the Y Sap and Lochnagar mines was witnessed by pilots who were flying over the battlefield to report back on British troop movements. It had been arranged that continuous overlapping patrols would fly throughout the day. 2nd Lieutenant Cecil Lewis (3 Squadron) was warned against flying too close to La Boisselle during his patrol, where two mines were due to go up but watched from a safe distance. Flying up and down the line in a Morane Parasol, he watched from above Thiepval, almost two miles from La Boisselle, and later described the early morning scene in his book Sagittarius Rising (1936 [1977 ed])

As aircraft from 3 Squadron flew over the III Corps area, observers reported that the 34th Division had reached Peake Wood on the right flank, increasing the size of the salient which had been driven into the German lines north of Fricourt but that the villages of La Boisselle and Ovillers had not fallen. On 3 July, air observers noted flares lit in the village during the evening, which were used to plot the positions reached by British infantry.

A communication tunnel was used to contact troops near the new crater and during the afternoon, troops from the 9th Cheshires of the 19th (Western) Division began to move forward and a doctor was sent from the Field Ambulance during the night. By  on 2 July, most of the 9th Cheshires had reached the crater and the German trenches adjacent, from which they repulsed several German counter-attacks during the night and the morning. On the evening of 2 July, the evacuation of wounded began and on 3 July, troops from the crater and the vicinity pushed forward to the south-east, occupying a small area against slight opposition.

Analysis
Despite their colossal size, the Lochnagar and Y Sap mines failed sufficiently to neutralise the German defences in La Boisselle. At Mash Valley, the attackers lost 5,100 men before noon and at Sausage Valley near the crater of the Lochnagar mine, there were over 6,000 casualties, the highest concentration on the battlefield. The 34th Division in III Corps had suffered the greatest number of casualties of the British divisions engaged on 1 July.

Commemoration

William Orpen, an official war artist, saw the mine crater in 1916 while touring the Somme battlefield, collecting subjects for paintings and described a wilderness of chalk dotted with shrapnel. John Masefield also visited the Somme, while preparing The Old Front Line (1917), in which he also described the area around the crater as dazzlingly white and painful to look at. Attempts to fill it in were resisted and the land was eventually purchased by an Englishman, Richard Dunning to ensure its preservation, after he read The Old Front Line and was inspired to buy a section of the former front line.

Dunning made more than  about land sales in the 1970s and was sold the crater. The site had been used by cross-country motorbikes and for fly tipping but Dunning erected a memorial cross on the rim of the crater in 1986, using reclaimed timber from a Gateshead church; the cross was struck by lightning shortly after its installation and was repaired with metal banding. The site attracts about  a year and there is an annual memorial service on 1 July, to commemorate the detonation of the mine and the British, French and German war dead, when poppy petals are scattered into the crater. Richard Dunning, the owner of the crater, was awarded an MBE in the 2017 New Year Honours for services to First World War remembrance.

Gallery

See also 

 List of the largest artificial non-nuclear explosions
 The Battle of the Crater from the American Civil War

Notes

Footnotes

Bibliography

Books
 
 
 
 
 
 
 
 
 
 
 
 
 
 

Websites

External links 

 Simon Jones, The Lochnagar Mine
 Lochnagar Crater - The Official Site
 Aerial view with front lines
 Aerial view of Ovillers-La-Boisselle; the crater of the Lochnagar  mine is visible near the bottom
 Surface model of the Y Sap, Glory Hole and Lochnagar craters
 360° Panoramic View
 La Boisselle Study Group
 Ovillers-La-Boisselle photo essay
 Grimsby Roll of Honour, 1914–1919
 Reid, P. Lochnagar Crater, La Boisselle
 Son of a bus mechanic preserves hallowed crater from WWI

Battle of the Somme
Tunnel warfare in World War I
World War I sites in France
Explosions in 1916
Conflicts in 1916
1916 in France
Battles of the Western Front (World War I)
Battles of World War I involving France
Battles of World War I involving Germany
Battles of World War I involving the United Kingdom
Monuments and memorials in Somme (department)
World War I memorials